Marie-Claude Deslières (born 1 April 1966) is a Canadian water polo player. She competed in the women's tournament at the 2000 Summer Olympics.

See also
 List of World Aquatics Championships medalists in water polo

References

External links
 

1966 births
Living people
Canadian female water polo players
Olympic water polo players of Canada
Water polo players at the 2000 Summer Olympics
Water polo players from Montreal